Stanford is a deserted village and civil parish in the English county of Norfolk.

The villages name means "stony ford".

The village became deserted when it was taken over by the British Army during the Second World War as part of the Stanford Battle Area, an infantry training area that is still in use. The village and most of the parish are within a restricted area and access is not allowed without special permission from the Army.

The parish church of All Saints, like the other surviving churches within the training area, is fitted with blast-proof sheeting to protect the structure, and wire fencing surrounds the church and churchyard to protect from military manoeuvres.

For the purposes of local government, the parish falls within the district of Breckland. At the 2011 census the population remained less than 100 and was included in the civil parish of Croxton.

Notes

http://kepn.nottingham.ac.uk/map/place/Norfolk/Stanford

External links

All Saints on the European Round Tower Churches website
Information from Genuki Norfolk on Stanford.
Information from NorfolkChurches.co.uk on the Stanford Battle Area and its deserted villages and churches.

 

Villages in Norfolk
Former populated places in Norfolk
Ghost towns in England
Civil parishes in Norfolk
Breckland District

Forcibly depopulated communities in the United Kingdom during World War II